Noah Schneeberger (born 23 May 1988) is a Swiss professional ice hockey defenceman currently playing for  EHC Biel of the National League (NL).

References

External links

1988 births
Living people
Swiss ice hockey defencemen
EHC Biel players
HC Davos players
HC Fribourg-Gottéron players
Genève-Servette HC players
SC Langenthal players
Lausanne HC players
SC Rapperswil-Jona Lakers players
SCL Tigers players
HCB Ticino Rockets players